The Battle of Purandar was fought between the Mughal Empire and Maratha Empire in 1665. The Mughal Emperor, Aurangzeb, appointed Jai Singh to lead a 14,000 strong army against Shivaji and deputed several Mughal commanders like Dilir Khan, Rai Singh, Sujan Singh and Daud Khan to serve Jai Singh in his campaign. to besiege Shivaji's fortress at Purandar. After Mughal forces killed Maratha General, Murarbaji on 2 June 1665, Shivaji surrendered and gave up 23 of his fortresses.

Background
Shivaji Maharaj attacked six Mughal generals at Lal Mahal of Poona (Now Pune). Then Shivaji Maharaj sacked Surat, a prosperous port city back then which inhabited lots of rich merchants from all parts of India, China, Turkey, England and the Netherlands. Shivaji Maharaj got huge amount of wealth in this loot. Later, in 1665 Aurangzeb sent his general Mirza Raja Jai Singh to subdue Shivaji Maharaj and the Adil Shahi dynasty.

Siege of Purandar
Jai Singh besieged Purandar fort in 1665. He won the neighbouring Vajragad fort in the middle of April. He surrounded Purandar and attacked the walls of the fort with cannons. Marathas fought bravely. The commandant Murarbaji fought courageously. He with his selected 700 fighters made a sortie on Diler Khan, who was only second in command after Mirza Rajah Jai Singh. Diler Khan with his 5000 Afghans and some more troop of other races was trying to climb the hill. Marathas marched forward and attacked these Mughal enemy from all sides and fought severe fighting at close quarters. Murar Baji and his Maratha men slew 500 Pathan and Bahlia infantrymen. Murar Baji rushed towards Diler Khan. The later offered him high post under him and promised his life. Murar indignantly refused and was going to strike Diler Khan when the latter shot him down with an arrow.
The garrison continued the struggle. But due to the firing of cannons 5 towers and one stockade won by enemies. The garrison had only 2000 Maratha soldiers against at least ten times that number of enemies. They had suffered heavy number of casualties in the 2 months' incessant fight. Shivaji found it futile to prolong and resist. The families of Maratha officers were sheltered inside the fort, so its capture would cause captivity. Due to this, Shivaji decided to meet Jai Singh and offer terms of peace. If these were rejected, he would make alliance with Adil Shah by restoring Konkan and continuing war against the Mughals with renewed vigour.

Treaty of Purandar 

The Treaty of Purandar was signed on 11 June 1665, between Jai Singh I, commander of the Mughal Empire, and Shivaji. Shivaji Maharaj was forced to sign the agreement after Jai Singh besieged Purandar fort. When Shivaji Maharaj realised that war with the Mughal Empire would only cause damage to his empire with possibility of his men suffering heavy losses, he chose to enter the treaty instead of leaving his men under the Mughals.

Terms
Following are the main points of the treaty:
 Shivaji kept twelve forts, along with an area worth an income of 100,000 (1 lakh) huns.
 Shivaji was required to help the Mughals whenever and wherever required.
 Shivaji's son Sambhaji was tasked with the command of a 5,000-strong force to fight for Mughals as Mansabdar.
 If Shivaji wanted to claim the Konkan area under Bijapur's control, he would have to pay 4 million (40 lakh) hons to the Mughals.
 He had to give up his 23 forts, which include Purandar, Rudramal, Kondana, Karnala, Lohagad, Isagad, Tung, Tikona, Rohida fort, Nardurga, Mahuli, Bhandardurga, Palaskhol, Rupgad, Bakhtgad, Morabkhan, Manikgad (Raigad), Saroopgad, Sagargad, Marakgad, Ankola, Songad, and Mangad. 

Along with these requirements, Shivaji agreed to visit Agra to meet Aurangzeb for further political talks.

Aftermath 
Jai Singh stopped his attack on Purandar, allowing 7000 residents of the fort to come out which included 4000 Maratha warriors. Shivaji handed over his forts to Jai Singh. Later Shivaji and his forces fought along with Jai Singh against Adil Shah of Bijapur but failed to win.Later Shivaji travelled to Agra to Aurangzeb's court. But Aurangzeb put him under house arrest for a few months. Shivaji managed to escape and returned home. Aurangzeb blamed Jai Singh's son Ram Singh for Shivaji's escape and demoted him.

References

Purandar 1665
Conflicts in 1665
1665 in India